Callington was any of various wards and electoral divisions of Cornwall in the United Kingdom.

The most recent was the Callington division which returned one member to sit on Cornwall Council between 2009 and boundary changes at the 2021 elections, when it was succeeded by Callington and St Dominic.

There were also Callington divisions on Cornwall County Council from 1973 to 2009 electing one member, and on Caradon District Council electing two members from 1973 to 2003 and three from 2003 to 2009.

Cornwall Council

Councillors

Extent
Callington represented the town of Callington as well as the hamlet of Frogwell and part of the hamlet of Newbridge (which was shared with the St Dominick, Harrowbarrow and Kelly Bray division). Although the division was nominally abolished in boundary changes at the 2013 elections, this had very little impact on the ward. Both before and after the boundary changes, the division covered 787 hectares.

Election results

2017 election

2013 election

2009 election

Cornwall County Council

Councillors

Election results

2005 election

2001 election

1997 election

1993 election

1989 election

1985 election

1981 election

1977 election

1973 election

Caradon District Council

Councillors

Election results

2007 election

2003 election

1999 election

1995 election

1991 election

1987 election

1983 election

1979 election

1976 election

1973 election

Notes

References

Electoral divisions of Cornwall Council
Callington
Electoral divisions of Cornwall County Council